The Desert Hawk is a 1950 action adventure film directed by Frederick De Cordova starring Yvonne De Carlo and Richard Greene.

Plot
An arranged marriage forces Arabian Princess Scheherazade to marry Prince Murad, a cruel ruler. A thief known as the Desert Hawk hears about the wedding, disguises himself as Murad in order to steal the wedding gifts. The next morning the real Murad shows up and finding the dowry gone orders his men to make it appear that the Desert Hawk has massacred the locals.

When the princess learns she has been tricked she changes clothes with one of her maids, who is then mistaken for the princess and murdered. The servants, along with the disguised princess, are rounded up and sold into slavery. The Desert Hawk purchases her at the slave market.

Meanwhile, Murad in a bid to consolidate his power stirs up trouble a neighbour, telling the princess's father that the neighbour has been aiding the Desert Hawk.

The princess' father entrusts Murad to avenge his daughter and murdered people enabling him to pursue the Desert Hawk to try to get the Princess and power for himself.

Cast
 Yvonne De Carlo  as Princess Scheherazade
 Richard Greene  as Omar aka The Desert Hawk
 Jackie Gleason  as Aladdin
 George Macready  as Prince Murad
 Rock Hudson  as Captain Ras
 Carl Esmond  as Kibar
 Joe Besser  as Prince Sinbad
 Anne P. Kramer  as Yasmin
 Marc Lawrence  as Samad
 Lois Andrews  as Maznah
 Frank Puglia  as Ahmed Bey
 Lucille Barkley  as Undine
 Donald Randolph  as Caliph
 Ian MacDonald  as Yussef

Production
Universal bought the story in January 1950. The film was envisioned as a vehicle for Yvonne de Carlo. Douglas Fairbanks Jr was sought for the male lead. The role eventually went to Richard Greene, returning to Hollywood after two years in Britain. Jackie Gleason signed to play a comic support role. Universal contract player Rock Hudson, who had just impressed in Winchester 73, was also cast.

Director de Cordova said Greene was "everything a man or woman could want in a desert hero."

References

External links

1950 films
1950s fantasy adventure films
American fantasy adventure films
Films directed by Frederick de Cordova
Films set in the Middle East
Universal Pictures films
1950s historical adventure films
American historical adventure films
Films scored by Frank Skinner
1950s historical fantasy films
Films with screenplays by Aubrey Wisberg
1950s English-language films
1950s American films